Kathleen M. Hamm (born February 2, 1963) is an American lawyer, federal regulator and fintech and cybersecurity expert, formerly a board member of the Public Company Accounting Oversight Board, and Counselor to the Deputy Secretary of the U.S. Department of Treasury for cyber policy and financial regulation. In April 2021, her alma mater, University at Buffalo School of Management, named her Accountant of the Year.

She was the Global Leader of Securities and Fintech Services and Senior Strategic Adviser on Cyber Solutions to the chief executive officer of Promontory Financial Group, a wholly owned subsidiary of IBM. Hamm was a pioneer in developing processes to embed regulatory requirements and cybersecurity into business operations and controls, changing how business systems are developed and improving their consumer protection. After leaving public service, Hamm established Pearl Advisory Group, LLC. She serves on the boards of The Reserve Trust Company, Inc., a financial institution; the Long-Term Stock Exchange, Inc., a new exchange focusing on long-term value creation; and Manetu, Inc., a startup privacy management platform. She also is a member of the Duke University School of Law Board of Visitors; the Duke Law School Global Financial Markets Advisory Board, the Steering Committee of the Climate Risk Disclosure Lab at Duke University; and the Dean's Advisory Council for the University at Buffalo School of Management, SUNY.

Early life and education

Hamm was born on February 2, 1963, in Albany, NY.  She graduated from the University at Buffalo, SUNY, in 1985 with a B.S., summa cum laude, with distinction, majoring in business administration, concentrating in accounting; from Duke University School of Law in 1988 with a J.D., with honors; and from Georgetown University Law Center in 1994 first in her class, with an LL.M. in Securities Regulation, with distinction.

Career

Hamm was appointed to the Board of the PCAOB in January 2018 by the Commissioners of the Securities and Exchange Commission, after consultation with the chair of the Board of Governors of the Federal Reserve System and the secretary of the Treasury. She earned a reputation for using the bully pulpit to increase auditors’ focus on cybersecurity, especially when conducting their risk assessments, and left the Board in November 2019 after completing her term. Under a new Biden Administration, in 2021, a Financial Times commentator, among others, called for Hamm to be reappointed to the Board.

She joined the PCAOB from Promontory Financial Group, where she was the Global Leader of Securities and Fintech Services and Senior Strategic Adviser on Cyber Solutions to the chief executive officer, Eugene Ludwig, from February 2017 to January 2018. This was her second time working at Promontory, where she started out as a managing director, building the securities practice (October 2004 to September 2014). She was an early advocate for exchanges, hedge funds and global companies to improve their regulatory compliance and cybersecurity by embedding their legal requirements into their operations and control environments. In between the two positions at Promontory, Hamm served as Counselor to the Deputy Secretary of the U.S. Department of Treasury for cyber policy and financial regulation (September 2014 to January 2017). At Treasury, she also represented the United States on a cybersecurity expert group impaneled by the G7 finance ministers and central bank governors.

From 2001 to early 2004, Hamm served as the Senior Vice President in Charge of Regulation and Compliance for the Nasdaq-Liffe Markets(NQLX), which closed in December 2004. She worked briefly (2000 to 2001) at Wilson Sonsini Goodrich & Rosati, P.C., as a securities attorney; and at Streich, Lang, Weeks & Cardon, P.A. (1988 to 1990), as a corporate and securities associate.

She started her career at the SEC in the Division of Enforcement (1991 to 2000) as a Staff Attorney and Senior Counsel (1991 to 1995), then a Branch Chief (1995 to 1997), and an assistant director (1997 to 2000).

Professional memberships and activities 

Hamm is a Member of the Bar in the District of Columbia, California, and Arizona. She is a Member of the Duke Law School Board of Visitors and the Duke Law School Global Financial Markets Advisory Board. Hamm also serves on the Dean’s Advisory Council for the University at Buffalo School of Management, SUNY. Prior to joining the PCAOB, Hamm was an adjunct professor at Georgetown University Law Center, teaching corporate controls, compliance, and governance. Hamm also was a Director, Member of the executive committee, and Chair of the Regulatory Oversight Committee of the National Stock Exchange, which is now part of the New York Stock Exchange, from early 2012 until its sale in the fall of 2014.

References

External links 

 Kathleen M. Hamm, speech, (May 2, 2019), "Cybersecurity: Where We Are; What More Can be Done? A Call for Auditors to Lean In," Baruch College 18th Annual Financial Reporting Conference.
 Michael Cohn, (May 2, 2019), "PCAOB board member wants auditors to be more vigilant about cybersecurity," Accounting Today.
 Ramona Dzinkowski, (Oct. 1, 2019), “Cyber Risk: Time to Elevate the Agenda," Strategic Finance magazine. "According to a May 2019 speech by Kathleen Hamm, a Public Company Accounting Oversight Board (PCAOB) board member, auditors should be looking more deeply into companies’ cyber-risk exposure and the controls in place to minimize cyberattacks. Her recommendations translate into a new agenda for auditors and for companies’ risk management and control practices."
 Tory Newmeyer, (Oct. 25, 2019), "The Finance 202: Mike Pence's big China speech makes ripples, not waves," The Washington Post.

1963 births
Living people
University at Buffalo alumni